Changbang station is a railway station in Changbang-ri, Haeju City, South Hwanghae Province, North Korea, on the Hwanghae Ch'ŏngnyŏn Line of the Korean State Railway. It is also the western terminus of the Paech'ŏn Line.

History
Changbang station was opened by the Chosen Railway on 11 December 1930, along with the rest of the Hakhyŏn–East Haeju section of the former Sahae Line.

References

Railway stations in North Korea